John Bryan may refer to:

John Bryan (MP) (by 1487 – 1524 or later), MP for Plymouth
John Bryan (ejected minister) (died 1676), Puritan ejected by the Act of Uniformity 1662
John Heritage Bryan (1798–1870), U.S. Representative from North Carolina
John Neely Bryan (1810–1877), Presbyterian farmer, lawyer, and founder of the city of Dallas, Texas
John Bryan (art director) (1911–1969), Academy Award-winning art director
John Bryan (journalist) (1934–2007), newspaper publisher
John Bryan (diplomat), high commissioner of the Cook Islands
John H. Bryan (1936–2018), CEO of the Sara Lee Corporation
John Bryan (cricketer) (1841–1909), English cricketer
John Bryan (footballer) (1877–1940), English footballer
John A. Bryan (1794–1864), American diplomat and politician from New York and Ohio
Jack Bryan (John Lindsay Bryan, 1896–1985), English cricketer
John Stewart Bryan (1871–1944), president of the College of William and Mary, 1934–1942
John Bryan (Wesleyan Methodist minister) (1776–1856), Welsh Wesleyan Methodist minister
John Letcher Bryan (1848–1898), American politician, mayor of Orlando, Florida
John Melvin Bryan Sr. (1886–1940), printer and political figure in British Columbia
John Melvin Bryan Jr. (1912–1992), Canadian politician
John Bryan State Park, Ohio
John Bryan, drummer with The Whirling Dervishes